The following is a list of the various media from the Scooby-Doo franchise which includes series, specials, films, video games, comics and theatrical productions.

Television series

Seasonal shows

Crossover episodes

Films

Animated films

Animated television films

Animated direct-to-video films

Animated theatrical films

Cancelled films

Live-action films

Live-action theatrical films

Live-action television films

Live-action direct-to-video films

Specials

Television specials

Direct-to-video specials

Shorts

Television shorts

Direct-to-video shorts

Web shorts

Comics

Series

Singles

Filmstrips

Video games

Plays

See also 
 Scooby-Doo! in film
 Hanna-Barbera Educational Filmstrips
 Hanna-Barbera Superstars 10

References 

 
Media
Scooby-Doo